Chapakot may refer to:

Chapakot, Kaski
Chapakot Municipality